Marco Saligari (born 18 May 1965 in Sesto San Giovanni) is a directeur sportif and former Italian road bicycle racer who raced during the 1990s. Since 2002, Saligari has served as manager of the Landbouwkrediet (formerly Colnago-Landbouwkrediet) squad.

In a marathon breakaway, Saligari won stage 17 at the 1993 Giro d'Italia by escaping after only riding twelve kilometers of the 211 km stage. He finished alone atop the 1,815 meter climb of Valle Vairata after dropping countrymen Gianluca Bortolami and Mauro Santaromita with 38 km remaining.

Major achievements 

1992
 1 stage, Giro d'Italia
1993
 1st, Overall, Tour de Suisse
 Stage 17, Giro d'Italia
1994
 1 stage, Giro d'Italia
 1 stage, Tour de Suisse
1996 – MG-Technogym
 9th, Overall, Volta a Catalunya (and Stage 1 win)
 72nd, Overall, Tour de France
1997 – Casino
 95th, Overall, Tour de France
1998 – Casino C'est Votre Equipe
 1st, Grand Prix d'Ouverture La Marseillaise

External links 
 Cyclingnews.com 2002 Diaries

1965 births
Living people
Italian male cyclists
Italian Giro d'Italia stage winners
Cyclists from the Metropolitan City of Milan
People from Sesto San Giovanni
Tour de Suisse stage winners